Qowzlujeh (also Romanized as Qowzlūjeh and Qvozlūjeh; also known as Kozundja, Qowzlejeh, Qozlūjeh, and Qūzlūcheh) is a village in Mangur-e Sharqi Rural District, Khalifan District, Mahabad County, West Azerbaijan Province, Iran. At the 2006 census, its population was 213, in 29 families.

References 

Populated places in Mahabad County